Thanakha, also spelled thanakha, is a paste made from ground bark. It is a distinctive feature of the culture of Myanmar, seen commonly applied to the face and sometimes the arms of women and girls, and is used to a lesser extent also by men and boys.

History
Thanakha is used by Burmese people since the mid-11th century. In a Bagan Pagoda, there is a Bagan era wall painting of a Bagan woman wearing thanakha. The earliest literary reference to thanakha is in a 14th-century poem written by King Razadarit's Mon-speaking consort. During King Bayinnaung, Alungpaya and Bodawpaya's military campaign in Thailand, thanakha was first introduced to Thai people. Mentions of thanaka also exist in the 15th-century literary works of Burmese monk-poet Shin Raṭṭhasāra (1486–1529).

Source and preparation

The wood of several trees may be used to produce thanaka cream; these trees grow abundantly in central Myanmar. They include principally Murraya spp. (thanaka) but also Limonia acidissima (theethee or wood apple). The two most popular are Shwebo thanaka from Sagaing Region and Shinmadaung thanaka from Magway Region. A more recent contender sold as a paste is Taunggyi Maukme thanaka from southern Shan State. Thanaka trees are perennials, and a tree must be at least 35 years old before it is considered mature enough to yield good-quality cuttings. Thanaka in its natural state is sold as small logs individually or in bundles, but nowadays also available as a paste or in powder form.

Thanaka cream is made by grinding the bark, wood, or roots of a thanaka tree with a small amount of water on a circular slate slab called kyauk pyin, which has a channel around the rim for the water to drain into.

Application, style and properties
Thanaka cream has been used by Burmese men, women, and children (especially women as make-up) for over 2,000 years. It has a fragrant scent somewhat similar to sandalwood. The creamy paste is applied to the face in attractive designs, the most common form being a circular patch on each cheek, nose, sometimes made stripey with the fingers known as thanaka bè gya, or patterned in the shape of a leaf, often also highlighting the bridge of the nose with it at the same time. It may be applied from head to toe (thanaka chi zoun gaung zoun). Apart from cosmetic beauty, thanaka also gives a cooling sensation and provides protection from sunburn. It is believed to help remove acne and promote smooth skin. It is also an anti-fungal. Marmesin has been proposed to be the principle UV blocking agent.

Thanaka bark 

Thanaka trees can be found all over the place in massive portions in Myanmar. The natives of Myanmar do rely on Thanaka as a face mask. Many times used by females all over the face for hair removal. Thanaka powder is obtained after grinding and turns the bark into a lightweight brown, perfumed paste that's put within the face in giant portions. A study was conducted in 2010 by the Chulalongkorn University in Bangkok and the University of London. Thanaka bark is antioxidant, anti-inflammatory and absorbs UV rays. The research additionally revealed that Thanaka inhibits tyrosine, the enzyme that triggers melanin synthesis and impacts pores and skin discolouration–therefore, even skin tone.

See also
 Borak (cosmetic)
 Face powder
 Culture of Myanmar
 Culture of India
 Hinduism in Myanmar

Notes

Burmese culture
Cosmetics
Skin care
Wood products